Jam Sanjar was 14th Jam from the Samma dynasty, who ruled from 1453 to 1461.

Biography
On Ráinah's death, Sanjar became the Jám of Sind. By legend, before his ascent to the throne, a pious fakír had highly favoured him. When Sanjar informed him that he had a very strong desire to become the king of Tattá, though for only 8 days, the fakír gave him his blessings, telling him that he would be the king for 8 years.

During his rule, Jám Sanjar distributed money to charities and increased the pay of responsible officers. After reigning for 8 years, he died in 896 A.H. (1490 A.D.)

References 

This article includes content derived from "History of Sind - translated from Persian books" by Mirza Kalichbeg Fredunbeg (1853-1929), published in Karachi in 1902 and now in the public domain.

Pakistani royalty
History of Sindh
Jamote people